The Most Outstanding Rookie Award is annually awarded to the player judged to be the best player in his first year in the Canadian Football League. The two nominees for the award are the Frank M. Gibson Trophy winner from the East Division, and the Jackie Parker Trophy winner from the West Division.

CFL's Most Outstanding Rookie Award winners

1972 - Chuck Ealey (QB), Hamilton Tiger-Cats
1973 - Johnny Rodgers (WR), Montreal Alouettes
1974 - Sam Cvijanovich (LB), Toronto Argonauts
1975 - Tom Clements (QB), Ottawa Rough Riders
1976 - John Sciarra (QB), BC Lions
1977 - Leon Bright (WR), BC Lions
1978 - Joe Poplawski (WR), Winnipeg Blue Bombers
1979 - Brian Kelly (WR), Edmonton Eskimos
1980 - William Miller (RB), Winnipeg Blue Bombers
1981 - Vince Goldsmith (LB), Saskatchewan Roughriders
1982 - Chris Isaac (QB), Ottawa Rough Riders
1983 - Johnny Shepherd (RB), Hamilton Tiger-Cats
1984 - Dwaine Wilson (RB), Montreal Concordes
1985 - Mike Gray (DT), BC Lions
1986 - Harold Hallman (DT), Calgary Stampeders
1987 - Gil Fenerty (RB), Toronto Argonauts
1988 - Orville Lee (RB), Ottawa Rough Riders
1989 - Stephen Jordan (DB), Hamilton Tiger-Cats
1990 - Reggie Barnes (RB), Ottawa Rough Riders
1991 - Jon Volpe (RB), BC Lions
1992 - Mike Richardson (RB), Winnipeg Blue Bombers
1993 - Mike O'Shea (LB), Hamilton Tiger-Cats
1994 - Matt Goodwin (DB), Baltimore CFLers
1995 - Shalon Baker (WR), Edmonton Eskimos
1996 - Kelvin Anderson (RB), Calgary Stampeders
1997 - Derrell Mitchell (SB), Toronto Argonauts
1998 - Steve Muhammad (DB), BC Lions
1999 - Paul Lacoste (LB), BC Lions
2000 - Albert Johnson III (WR), Winnipeg Blue Bombers
2001 - Barrin Simpson (LB), BC Lions
2002 - Jason Clermont (SB), BC Lions
2003 - Frank Cutolo (WR), BC Lions
2004 - Nikolas Lewis (WR), Calgary Stampeders
2005 - Gavin Walls (DE), Winnipeg Blue Bombers
2006 - Aaron Hunt (DT), BC Lions
2007 - Cameron Wake (DE), BC Lions
2008 - Weston Dressler (SB), Saskatchewan Roughriders
2009 - Martell Mallett (RB), BC Lions
2010 - Solomon Elimimian (LB), BC Lions
2011 - Chris Williams (WR), Hamilton Tiger-Cats
2012 - Chris Matthews (WR), Winnipeg Blue Bombers
2013 - Brett Jones (OL), Calgary Stampeders
2014 - Dexter McCoil (LB), Edmonton Eskimos
2015 - Derel Walker (WR), Edmonton Eskimos
2016 - DaVaris Daniels (WR), Calgary Stampeders
2017 - James Wilder Jr. (RB), Toronto Argonauts
2018 - Lewis Ward (K), Ottawa Redblacks
2019 - Nate Holley (LB), Calgary Stampeders
2020 – Season cancelled due to the COVID-19 pandemic
2021 - Jordan Williams (LB), BC Lions
2022 - Dalton Schoen (WR), Winnipeg Blue Bombers

See also
Frank M. Gibson Trophy
Jackie Parker Trophy

References

Canadian Football League trophies and awards
Rookie player awards